"Take Me Back" was a song composed by songwriter Teddy Randazzo, and was a 1965 hit song by Little Anthony and the Imperials.

Background
"Take Me Back" is a ballad about a plea for forgiveness.  The song was one of 5 hit singles taken from their 1964 hit album, Goin' Out of My Head, who also wrote several previous Imperials hit singles, including Goin' Out Of My Head and Hurt So Bad, and was produced by Randazzo and Don Costa for Randazzo's DCP Records label in 1964, released as a single in 1965, and later re-released in 1966 on United Artists' Veep Records subsidiary.
Take Me Back  was a Billboard Top 20 hit for The Imperials, reaching # 16 on the Billboard Hot 100, and a Top 20 R&B hit as well, peaking at # 15.

Personnel

The Imperials
"Little Anthony" Gourdine - Lead Vocals
Sammy Strain - First Tenor
Ernest Wright - Second Tenor
Clarence Collins - Baritone/Bass

Producers
Teddy Randazzo & Don Costa

Chart performance
It was a Billboard Top 20 Pop Hit, peaking at #16, and was a Top 20 R&B Hit as well, peaking at # 15.

References

"The Best Of Little Anthony & The Imperials" 1996 CD liner notes.

Little Anthony and the Imperials songs
1965 songs
Songs written by Teddy Randazzo
Glen Campbell songs